Pierre Decazes, stage name of Pierre Aderhold (12 July 1932 – 11 August 2020) was a French actor.

Biography
Pierre Aderhold gave himself the name "Decazes" for Decazeville, where he spent his childhood. Coming from a family of blue collar workers, Decazes lived in Paris and Lot. His brother, Gérard Aderhold, led the Poissonnerie Aderhold in Rodez and founded the Belondine oyster company within the Groupe Flo. Decazes was the father of two children. His son is writer Carl Aderhold.

Partial filmography

La Meule (1962)
La Foire aux cancres (1963)
L'Âge ingrat (1964) - Le cycliste (uncredited)
Les Cinq Dernières Minutes (19864-1988, TV Series) - M. Henri / Le premier brigadier
The Shameless Old Lady (1965) - Charlote
The War Is Over (1966) - L'employé SNCF / Station Employee
The Confession (1970)
Elise, or Real Life (1970)
Atlantic Wall (1970) - Soldat S.S. #1
There's No Smoke Without Fire (1973)
Les Mohicans de Paris (1973-1975, TV Series) - Justin
Lacombe, Lucien (1974) - Aubert
Les Fargeot (1974, TV Series) - L'épicier
Gross Paris (1974)
Mort de Raymond Roussel (1975, Short)
Calmos (1976)
Nouvelles d'Henry James (1976, TV Series) - L'officier
La situation est grave mais... pas désespérée (1976)
The Wing or the Thigh (1976) - Le patron de l'hôtel
Ben et Bénédict (1977) - Le maire
Petit déjeuner compris (1980, TV Mini-Series) - Le 1er candidat
Sacrés gendarmes (1980) - Le père belge
Les Enquêtes du commissaire Maigret (1983-1989, TV Series) - Le chef de gare / Yves Le Guerec
The Satin Slipper (1985) - Don Léopol August
Châteauvallon (1985, TV Series)
Bleu comme l'enfer (1986)
Bernadette (1988) - Le e préfet Massy
I Want to Go Home (1989) - Le garagiste

Theatre
The Birds (1960)
The Good Person of Szechwan (1960)
Le Vicaire (1963)
La Danse du Sergent Musgrave (1963)
The Dragon (1965)
The Condemned of Altona (1965)
The Mother (1968)
La Cage aux Folles (1973)
La Cage aux Folles (1978)
Retour à Eden Platz (1991)
C33 (1995)

References

1932 births
2020 deaths
French male actors